Theresia Widiastuti (born 1954) is an Indonesian former badminton player in the 70s.

Profile
Theresia Widiastuti is a specialist in women's doubles and mixed Indonesian players. In the 1975 Uber Cup, she played an important and decisive role because she managed to win in two women's doubles matches with Imelda Wiguno against Japanese women's doubles and led Indonesia to win the Uber Cup for the first time. In the 1976 Asian championships she also won the women's doubles with Regina Masli. and won two bronze in women's doubles in the 1974 and 1978 Asian games and one mixed doubles silver.

Achievements

Asian Games 
Women's doubles

Mixed doubles

Asian Championships 
Women's doubles

Southeast Asian Games 
Women's doubles

Mixed doubles

International Open Tournaments (2 titles, 1 runner-up) 
Women's doubles

Invitational Tournament 
Women's doubles

References 

 1954 births
Living people
People from Yogyakarta
Sportspeople from Special Region of Yogyakarta
Indonesian female badminton players
Badminton players at the 1970 Asian Games
Badminton players at the 1974 Asian Games
Badminton players at the 1978 Asian Games
Asian Games silver medalists for Indonesia
Asian Games bronze medalists for Indonesia
Asian Games medalists in badminton
Medalists at the 1970 Asian Games
Medalists at the 1974 Asian Games
Medalists at the 1978 Asian Games
Competitors at the 1977 Southeast Asian Games
Competitors at the 1979 Southeast Asian Games
Competitors at the 1981 Southeast Asian Games
Southeast Asian Games gold medalists for Indonesia
Southeast Asian Games silver medalists for Indonesia
Southeast Asian Games medalists in badminton
20th-century Indonesian women
21st-century Indonesian women